The 1977 Ohio State Buckeyes football team represented the Ohio State University in the 1977 Big Ten Conference football season. The Buckeyes compiled a 9–3 record, including the 1978 Sugar Bowl in New Orleans, Louisiana, where they lost 35–6 to the Alabama Crimson Tide.

Schedule

Roster

Depth chart

Game summaries

Miami (FL)

    
    

Ron Springs 27 Rush, 114 Yds

Minnesota

Ron Springs 27 Rush, 147 Yds

Oklahoma

at SMU

Purdue

Iowa

at Northwestern

Wisconsin

Illinois

Indiana

Michigan

Sugar Bowl

1978 NFL draftees

References

Ohio State
Ohio State Buckeyes football seasons
Big Ten Conference football champion seasons
Ohio State Buckeyes football